Shey Ling Him Gordon is a Panamanian beauty pageant contestant and model. She was the official representative of Panamá at the Miss World 2007 pageant held at the Crown of Beauty Theatre, Sanya, China on December 1, 2007. competed in the national beauty pageant Miss World Panamá 2007 and obtained the title of Miss World Panamá.

Miss World Panamá 2007
She competed and won the national beauty pageant Miss World Panamá 2007 held in the Ball Room of the Hotel Miramar, on October 3, 2007. Him represented Cocle. The 1st runner up was Kathia Saldaña from Panamá City (Later Miss World Panamá 2008 but withdrew).

References

Living people
People from Panama City
Miss World 2007 delegates
Panamanian female models
Panamanian beauty pageant winners
Panamanian people of Chinese descent
1986 births